Nakai is a district (muang) of Khammouane province in mid-Laos. Nakai-Nam Theun National Park is in Nakai District; its headquarters is in Oudomsouk Village.

References

Districts of Khammouane province